Uromyces graminis is a plant pathogen infecting carrots.

References

External links
 Index Fungorum
 USDA ARS Fungal Database

Fungal plant pathogens and diseases
Carrot diseases
graminis
Fungi described in 1892